Sir Robert Knollys KB (1547– 1619 or 1626) was an English courtier and politician who sat in the House of Commons at various times between 1572 and 1611.

Life
Knollys was the son of Sir Francis Knollys, Treasurer of the Royal Household, and  Catherine Carey, Lady of the Bedchamber to Queen Elizabeth I. He quickly entered the Queen's service. He grew up in Rotherfield Greys in Oxfordshire and Reading in Berkshire. In 1572, he was elected Member of Parliament for Reading.  He was Keeper of Syon House and steward of Isleworth in 1577 and usher of Tower mint from 1577 to 1582. From about 1583, he was a J.P. for Breconshire. He was elected MP for Reading again in 1584 and 1586. In 1587 he became a gentleman of the privy chamber.

In 1589 Knollys was elected MP for Reading and Breconshire and chose to sit for Breconshire. He became Deputy Lieutenant in 1590 and Custos Rotulorum in about 1592. In 1593 he was re-elected MP for Breconshire. He was elected MP for Breconshire again in 1597 and 1601. By 1603, he was esquire of the body and in July 1603 was made a Knight of the Bath. He was re-elected MP for Breconshire in 1604. He enjoyed sports and played bowls with the Earl of Shrewsbury. He also took part in tilting competitions and was seriously injured in November 1602.
 
Knollys died in January 1619, after a fall at the house of his brother William at Caversham.

Knollys married Catherine Vaughan, daughter of Rowland Vaughan of Porthamel in Brecknockshire and had two daughters: Frances (sometimes erroneously called Catherine) who married Sir Charles Vaughan and Lettice who married Framlingham Gawdy, the High Sheriff of Norfolk. He was brother of Edward, Francis, Richard, William and Henry Knollys who were all MPs.

Ancestry

References

1547 births
1619 deaths
Members of the Parliament of England (pre-1707) for constituencies in Wales
People from Reading, Berkshire
People from Rotherfield Greys
People from Brecknockshire
Robert 1619
English MPs 1572–1583
English MPs 1584–1585
English MPs 1586–1587
English MPs 1589
English MPs 1593
English MPs 1597–1598
English MPs 1601
English MPs 1604–1611
Members of the Parliament of England (pre-1707) for Reading
Knights of the Bath